Tytsjerksteradiel is a municipality in the province of Friesland in the Netherlands. It is named after the town of Tytsjerk, whose name is derived from a person named Tiete. Tiete was a daughter of Tryn, after whom the region (Trynwâlden) is named. The other villages in Trynwâlden are also named after Tryn's children: Oentsjerk (Oene), Gytsjerk (Giete), Readtsjerk (Reade), Aldtsjerk (Âlde), Ryptsjerk (Rype). A statue of Tryn and her children is placed in Oentsjerk next to the mainroad (Rengerswei). Tsjerk is the West Frisian word for Church. Until 1989 the official name of the municipality was Tietjerksteradeel, the Dutch name; the current official name is West Frisian.  The largest village in the municipality is Burgum.

Population centers 
The administrative centre and largest village in the municipality is Burgum.

Hamlets
 Altenburch (Altenburg)
 De Joere
 Gytsjerksterhoeke (Giekerkerhoek)
 Iniaheide
 It Heechsân (Hoogzand)
 It Wytfean (Witveen)
 Kûkherne (Kuikhorne) ((partially))
 Noardermar (Noordermeer)
 Lytse Geast (Kleinegeest)
 Quatrebras
 Sânhuzen (Zevenhuizen) 
 Sigerswâld (Siegerswoude)
 Skûlenboarch (Schuilenburg)
 Sumarreheide  (Suameerderheide)
 Swarteweisein (Zwartewegsend)
 Tergrêft (Tergraft) ((partially))

Main sights 
 Wyns, Aldtsjerk, Jistrum, Eastermar, Oentsjerk, Burgum and Gytsjerk are home to medieval churches
The villages Aldtsjerk, Earnewâld, Ryptsjerk, Sumar, Tytsjerk (De Lytse Geast and De Himriksmole) and Wyns are home to mills.
 The Burgumer Lake
 The Museum for Folklore in Earnewâld
 The Skûtsje-Museum in Earnewâld
 The Heimatmuseum with an Observatory in Burgum.

Notable people 

 Adriaen van Cronenburg (ca.1525 – 1604 in Bergum) a Northern Netherlandish painter of portraits
 Rombertus van Uylenburgh (1554 in Burgum – 1624) academic and father-in-law of Rembrandt
 Jurjentje Aukes Rauwerda (1812 in Oentsjerk – 1877) a Dutch prostitute and procurer. Ran the largest brothel in Amsterdam
 Tsjibbe Gearts van der Meulen (1824 in Burgum – 1906) writer, poet, clock-maker, book seller, printer and publisher
 Piet Bouman (1892 – 1980 in Tietjerksteradeel) a Dutch amateur football player who competed in the 1912 Summer Olympics
 Enneüs Heerma (1944 in Rijperkerk – 1999) a Dutch politician
 Henk Stallinga (born 1962 in Tytsjerksteradiel) a Dutch multidisciplinary contemporary artist
 Marjon Wijnsma (born 1965 in Giekerk) a retired Dutch heptathlete
 Doutzen Kroes (born 1985 in Eastermar) a Dutch model, actress, activist and philanthropist

Gallery

References

External links

Official website

 
Municipalities of Friesland